Tsz Wan East is one of the 25 constituencies in the Wong Tai Sin District in Hong Kong.

The constituency returns one district councillor to the Wong Tai Sin District Council, with an election every four years. The seat was held by Mok Yee-ha.

Tsz Wan East constituency is loosely based on the Tsz Hong Estate, Tsz Man Estate and part of the Tsz On Court in Tsz Wan Shan with an estimated population of 20,124.

Councillors represented

Election results

2010s

2000s

1990s

References

Tsz Wan Shan
Constituencies of Hong Kong
Constituencies of Wong Tai Sin District Council
1999 establishments in Hong Kong
Constituencies established in 1999